The EcoDiesel is a diesel engine used in Ram Trucks and Jeep vehicles since 2014. Introduced by Fiat Chrysler Automobiles, the EcoDiesel name was used for two different engines. The first was the VM Motori L630, the North American variant of the A 630 DOHC 3.0L engine, which was used in the Ram 1500 and the Jeep Grand Cherokee. The other was a 3.0 inline-4 Iveco diesel engine used in the Ram ProMaster, the North American version of the Fiat Ducato. The ProMaster with the Iveco/EcoDiesel was available for a few years and is no longer offered. 

This article focuses on the first of these two--the VM Motori engines used in Ram and Jeep products. The engine has been used in other vehicles as well, including Maseratis. 

Known for its high torque and efficiency the EcoDiesel Ram 1500 application gets 30% better fuel economy than the Ram 1500 equipped with a Hemi V8--with comparable performance.

In 2022 EcoDiesel engines are still made by VM Motori, now a fully owned subsidiary of Stellantis, and a sister company of Ram and Jeep. Stellantis was formed in 2021 when Fiat Chrysler merged with the French PSA Group.

First generation of EcoDiesel
The first generation is difficult to define. This section tracks the history of the engine before it was released as the EcoDiesel. The engine started as a prototype developed by VM Motori, an Italian manufacturer of diesel engines, in collaboration with General Motors--for a planned European Cadillac. GM's bankruptcy in 2009 doomed this effort. GM owned half of VM Motori from 2007 to 2013.

In February of 2011, Fiat bought 50% of VM Motori from Penske. GM retained its 50%. 

The engine was first offered in some non-U.S. markets starting in 2011. That summer Chrysler Australia released a Jeep Grand Cherokee with the VM Motori 3 liter V-6. The summer of 2011 is also when Fiat bought a controlling share of Chrysler from the U.S. Treasury, before buying the remaining shares from VEBA in January 2014. 

In 2012 the engine became available in Europe in the Chrysler 300C and the Lancia Thema. 

Fiat made VM Motori a fully owned subsidiary in 2013 when GM was ready to fully divest its stake. At that same time, Fiat was developing the engine for Ram and Jeep vehicles in North America.

In 2014, Dave Leone, GM's chief engineer of performance cars, said of the EcoDiesel, “that engine was in Cadillac CTS and SRX prototypes I drove here in Europe, (Fiat) picked it up for pennies on the dollar.”

EcoDiesel second generation
While called second generation, these were the first EcoDiesels to hit the market in the U.S. and Canada, and the first to use the EcoDiesel name. It was the VM Motori L630.

Ram released EcoDiesels in March of 2014 in its 1500 pickups to positive reviews and strong consumer demand--surpassing their expectations for the product. The fuel efficiency achieved hadn't been seen in a full-sized pickup before. From 2014 to 2019 this generation of the EcoDiesel was optional in the Ram 1500 and the Jeep Grand Cherokee.

The Ram 1500 with EcoDiesel is the first half-ton pickup with a diesel engine available in the U.S. in decades. There were a few half-tons with diesels in the lates 1970s, and GM offered them in the 1980s and 1990s. Other diesel pickup trucks that have been available for decades are heavier duty trucks.

Key specs, Ram 1500 application
 3.0L V6
  @ 3,600 RPM
  torque @ 2,000 RPM
 Fuel economy:  city,  highway (varies based on vehicle and engine tune)

Regulatory issues
In late 2015 diesels in the U.S. came under intense regulatory scrutiny as a result of the Volkswagen emissions scandal--including the EcoDiesel. The EPA broadened its investigations into 28 diesel-powered models made by BMW, Stellantis, General Motors, Jaguar Land Rover and Mercedes-Benz. 

In January 2017 the EPA and California regulators issue a "Notice of Violation" against Fiat Chrysler Automobiles (FCA), Ram's parent corporation, alleging violations of the Clean Air Act due to changes to vehicle software allowing excessive (and illegal) levels of nitrogen oxides into the air. That same month FCA CEO Sergio Marchionne disputed "any resemblance to Volkswagen’s Dieselgate scandal because nothing in FCA’s diesel calibration distinguishes between a test cycle and normal driving conditions," which was the case with Volkswagen. “This is a huge difference because there has never been an intention on the part of FCA to create conditions that are designed to defeat the testing process,” Marchionne said. 

Fiat Chrysler put the 2017s on stop sale and they were updated prior to being released, so this issue didn't impact model years 2017-2019.
   
In January of 2019 Fiat Chrysler settled with the U.S. Justice Department on behalf of the EPA and the state of California. This settlement applied to more than 100,000 2014-2016 model year vehicles. 

The settlement required Fiat Chrysler to repair at least 85% of the vehicles within two years or face additional penalties. This led to payments ranging from $2,450 to $3,075 for current owners and payments of $990 to former owners and eligible lessees and former lessees. To get the payment, current owners and lessees had to have a software update to their engine tune that resolved the issue. The software update created new performance issues, including lower fuel economy and loss of engine power, which Fiat Chrysler attempted to resolve with additional later updates.

For owners, the EcoDiesel case played out much differently than the Volkswagen situation with their TDI diesel engines. In the U.S. Volkswagen had to buy back most of the vehicles under the terms of their 2016 settlement with the government, Fiat Chrysler was able to repair all of theirs and no buybacks were offered.

Maserati with EcoDiesel

Further blurring the lines between the first and second generation of the EcoDiesel is the case of the Maserati. In 2014 the Maserati Ghibli and the Maserati Quattroporte were both released in Italy with the VM Motori engine used by Ram and Jeep. It had a different tune and was not branded as an EcoDiesel but it was the same engine. According to Motor Trend this was the first diesel Maserati in many years. 

"We're betting that a bunch of diesel Ram owners will be using their bragging rights to point out, 'Same engine as in a Maserati, y'know,'" wrote auto journalist John Voelcker.

EcoDiesel third generation
In June 2019, Fiat Chrysler announced a new generation of the EcoDiesel for the Ram Pickup (fifth generation) 1500s beginning in 2020. This updated engine is also available in Jeep Wrangler and Jeep Gladiators.

The third generation of the EcoDiesel was a complete redesign of the engine with 80% of its parts being new including a new turbocharger, new aluminum cylinder heads with revised intake ports, and an upgraded combustion system. Its new, high and low-pressure exhaust gas recirculation system reduces power loss from the turbo. Horsepower was improved 8% over the previous generation and torque was improved 14%. The Ram 1500 with the updated EcoDiesel has a payload capacity of 2,040 pounds and can tow 12,560 pounds. 

The updated EcoDiesel has garnered positive reviews. "As for the EcoDiesel, it impresses with its quiet and confident voice, steady power, easy response and smooth acceleration," wrote James Riswick in Autoblog. In 2022, based on its consumer reviews, the Ram 1500 is the only truck recommended by Consumer Reports. They tested all versions of the 1500 and called out the EcoDiesel for delivering the best fuel economy. The Ford and GM trucks lagged significantly in the Consumer Reports scoring.

Key specs, Ram 1500 application
 3.0L V6
  @ 3,600 RPM
  @ 2,000 RPM
 Fuel economy:  city,  highway (varies based on vehicle and engine tune)

Discontinuation of the Ram EcoDiesel

In mid-September of 2022, Ram announced the EcoDiesel will end production as of January 2023, making the 2023 model year the end of the road for that application of the engine. At the time of the announcement Ram executives emphasized the future was in electric trucks.

References

Chrysler engines
Jeep engines

External links
 EcoDiesel settlement website
 EcoDiesel videos and articles from TFL The Fast Lane Truck 
 Ram 1500 Diesel Forum
 Diesel Jeeps Forum